Pierre Prévert (26 May 1906 – 5 April 1988) was a French film director, screenwriter, and actor.

He is the brother of Jacques Prévert, who is the subject of his documentary Mon frère Jacques. He is the father of screenwriter Catherine Prévert.

Filmography

Film 
 1928 : Souvenir de Paris, collaboration with Jacques Prévert and Marcel Duhamel
 1932 : L'affaire est dans le sac
 1933 : Monsieur Cordon, story by Jean Aurenche
 1935 : Le commissaire est bon enfant, le gendarme est sans pitié, collaboration with Jacques Becker
 1943 : Adieu Léonard
 1946 : Voyage Surprise
 1958 : Paris mange son pain
 1960 : Paris la belle

Television 
 1961 : Mon frère Jacques
 1963 : Le Perroquet du fils Hoquet
 1964 : Le Petit Claus et le Grand Claus
 1965 : La Maison du passeur
 1966 : À la Belle Étoile
 1966 : Les Compagnons de Baal

Assistant director 
 1929 : Le Petit Chaperon rouge, by Alberto Cavalcanti 
 1931 : La Chienne by Jean Renoir
 1931 : Baleydier by Jean Mamy
 1932 : Fanny by Marc Allégret
 1934 : L'Hôtel du libre échange by Marc Allégret
 1935 : Fanfare d'amour by Richard Pottier
 1936 : Moutonnet, by René Sti
 1937 : Drôle de drame by Marcel Carné
 1937 : Mollenard by Robert Siodmak
 1938 : Le Récif de corail by Maurice Gleize
 1945 : Félicie Nanteuil by Marc Allégret

Actor 
 1929 : Le Petit Chaperon rouge, by Alberto Cavalcanti 
 1930 : La Joie d'une heure by André Cerf
 1930 : L'Âge d'or by Luis Buñuel
 1931 : Baleydier by Jean Mamy
 1931 : Les Amours de minuit by Augusto Genina et Marc Allégret
 1932 : Fanny by Marc Allégret
 1934 : L'Atalante, by Jean Vigo
 1935 : Le commissaire est bon enfant, le gendarme est sans pitié, court métrage de Jacques Becker + coréalisation
 1937 : Drôle de drame by Marcel Carné
 1943 : Le soleil a toujours raison by Pierre Billon
 1943 : Les Deux Timides by Yves Allégret
 1945 : Félicie Nanteuil by Marc Allégret

References

External links
Pierre Prévert

French film directors
French male screenwriters
French actors
1906 births
1988 deaths
20th-century French screenwriters